New Stadium of Tizi-Ouzou is a stadium that is being constructed in Tizi Ouzou, Algeria.   It will mainly host football matches and will be the home of JS Kabylie.  It will have a capacity of 50,766 spectators. It will replace the Stade 1er Novembre.

United States-based construction company Atlas Group subsidiary Atlas Genie Civil Spa completed the project in November 2022. Work officially started on May 15, 2010.

History
JS Kabylie managed to get the promise of a new stadium to match the club's sporting ambitions, from the Algerian president just after the club won their third CAF Cup.

The work officially started on May 15, 2010, but several delays, conceded for various hazards, pushed the delivery of the stadium to 2023.

In May 2019, due to the end of the contractual period with the ETRHB Haddad, the project experienced yet another stoppage. He had then reached an estimated completion rate of 85%.

On July 16, 2020, Minister of Youth and Sports Sid Ali Khaldi, who was making an inspection visit to the construction site, announced the termination of the contract of the ETRHB Haddad group in charge of the realization of the stadium. He had also announced on the occasion the establishment of new specifications for the rest of the work. This is in order to launch the consultations in order to retain another company to take over the site.

In May 2020, the site was then entrusted to the public company Cosider to relaunch the 15% to 20% of the work that remained to be done. This company did not receive its service order (ODS) until September 2020. "The remaining works must be completed within a period not exceeding 12 months", i.e. before the end of 2021, according to the contract between this company and the local authorities.

On February 27, 2022, the Minister of Housing, Urban Planning and the City, Mohamed Tarek Belaribi, gave instructions to the project managers to speed up the administrative procedure to allow the resumption of construction.

In concrete terms, work did not resume until April 2022. The site was relaunched on Thursday, April 14, 2022, by the Minister for Housing, Urban Planning and the City, Tarek Belaribi, who carried out the occasion his second visit in the space of a few weeks to the site. On occasion, the company was called upon to step up the pace in order to deliver the project on time, estimated at 12 months.

On June 18, 2022, the president of the People's Assembly of the wilaya of Tizi Ouzou, Mohamed Klalèche, announced that he had called a Turkish company for reinforcements to help Cosider complete the work on time.

On September 29, 2022, the Minister of Housing, Mohamed Tarek Belaribi, carried out an inspection visit to this infrastructure and assessed the progress of the work at 45%. The Minister also announced the end of the exterior works at the end of October 2022, those at the level of the stands on November 1, and the final delivery of the new Tizi Ouzou stadium at the beginning of 2023.

Name of the stadium
No official name has been determined and this stadium is still known as the new Stadium of Tizi-Ouzou for now. Many names have been suggested and discussed among the population; among them the name of Abdelkader Khalef and Mohand Cherif Hannachi because of their legacy and everything they did for JS Kabylie. The name of the singer Lounès Matoub has also been suggested, but actually, only the name of Hocine Aït-Ahmed seems to reach consensus.

See also

List of football stadiums in Algeria
List of African stadiums by capacity
List of association football stadiums by capacity

References

External links
Stadium information

Abdelkader
Stadiums under construction
Buildings and structures in Tizi Ouzou Province